Acid alpha-glucosidase, also called α-1,4-glucosidase and acid maltase, is an enzyme that helps to break down glycogen in the lysosome. It is functionally similar to glycogen debranching enzyme, but is on a different chromosome, processed differently by the cell and is located in the lysosome rather than the cytosol. In humans, it is encoded by the GAA gene. Errors in this gene cause glycogen storage disease type II (Pompe disease).

Function 

This gene encodes lysosomal alpha-glucosidase, which is essential for the degradation of glycogen to glucose in lysosomes. Different forms of acid alpha-glucosidase are obtained by proteolytic processing. Defects in this gene are the cause of glycogen storage disease II, also known as Pompe disease, which is an autosomal recessive disorder with a broad clinical spectrum. Three transcript variants encoding the same protein have been found for this gene.

References

Further reading

External links 
 GeneReview/NIH/UW entry on Glycogen Storage Disease Type II (Pompe Disease)